Hypnotic Records is an American independent record label specializing in electronic music.

History 
Hypnotic Records is the sub-label to Cleopatra Records owned by Brian Perera.  Specializing in electronic dance music. As electronic music mutated, the company worked like a railroad crew, staying a few steps ahead, laying the tracks for the genre to ride onward. Top dance acts like Future Sound Of London and Loop Guru would send the Hypnotic Records offshoot into the stratosphere. The early rave culture expanded to define a large segment of a chemical generation and Hypnotic was there to chronicle its stars like Crystal Method and its misunderstood adherents on the award winning documentary DVD: Better Living Through Circuitry. Later the label would also release groundbreaking works from the DJs ; Paul Oakenfold and Superstar DJ Keoki as well as seeking new talent like the Electric Heaven and Blackburner

Roster
 Blackburner
 Brand Blank
 Brian Perera
 Dirty Sanchez
 DMX
 Dubstep Junkies
 Effcee
 Electric Heaven
 Future Sound of London
 Katfyr
 Klaypex
 Mike Jones
 New Skin
 DJ Keoki
 Talla 2XLC

Notable guests 
 Nero
 Zeds Dead
 Funkstar De Luxe
 Borgore
 Virius Syndicate
 Dubba Jonny
 Freestylers feat Flux Pavilion
 KOAN Sound
 MartyParty
 Ladytron
 Boys Noize
 Tommie Sunshine
 Rusko
 Unsub/Alexis K

See also 
 List of record labels
 List of electronic music record labels

References

External links
 Official site
 Hypnotic Records
 Hypnotic on Allmusic.com

Electronic music record labels
American independent record labels
Record labels established in 1997